Doğanyurt District is a district of the Kastamonu Province of Turkey. Its seat is the town of Doğanyurt. Its area is 193 km2, and its population is 5,428 (2021).

Composition
There is one municipality in Doğanyurt District:
 Doğanyurt

There are 25 villages in Doğanyurt District:

 Akçabel
 Aşağımescit
 Baldıran
 Başköy
 Belyaka
 Boğazcık
 Çakırlı
 Danışman
 Demirci
 Denizbükü
 Denizgörülen
 Düz
 Düzağaç
 Gökçe
 Gözalan
 Gürmüdü
 Haskavak
 Kayran
 Köfünambarı
 Küçüktepe
 Ortaburun
 Şirin
 Taşlıpınar
 Yassıkışla
 Yukarımescit

References

Districts of Kastamonu Province